The first season of Reign,  an American historical fantasy romance television series, consists of 22 episodes that aired on The CW between October 17, 2013, and May 15, 2014. The series follows the early exploits of Mary, Queen of Scots, and was created by Stephanie SenGupta and Laurie McCarthy.

Cast and characters

Main
 Adelaide Kane as Mary, Queen of Scots
 Toby Regbo as Francis II of France
 Megan Follows as Catherine de' Medici
 Torrance Coombs as Sebastian "Bash" de Poitiers
 Jenessa Grant as Lady Aylee
 Celina Sinden as Lady Greer 
 Caitlin Stasey as Lady Kenna
 Anna Popplewell as Lady Lola 
 Alan van Sprang as King Henry II of France

Recurring
 Rossif Sutherland as Nostradamus
 Jonathan Keltz as Leith Bayard 
 Amy Brenneman as Marie de Guise 
 Michael Therriault as Aloysius Castleroy 
 Anna Walton as Diane de Poitiers 
 Gil Darnell as Christian, Duke of Guise 
 Yael Grobglas as Olivia D'Amencourt 
 Kathryn Prescott as Penelope 
 Giacomo Gianniotti as "Lord Julien"/Remy
 Luke Roberts as Simon Westbrook

Guest
 Manolo Cardona as Prince Tomas of Portugal
 Michael Aronov as Count Vincent of Italy
 Ted Atherton as Lord Hugo
 Daniel Fathers as Alec
 Greg Bryk as Richard Delacroix
 Jonathan Higgins as Archduke Ferdinand of Bohemia
 Hannah Anderson as Rowan
 Kristian Hodko as Carrick
 Andrew Airlie as Lord MacKenzie
 Joe Doyle as James Stewart, Earl of Moray
 Tahmoh Penikett as Johnathon "John"
 Shauna MacDonald as Hortenza
 Lucius Hoyos as Pascal
 Sarah Winter as Yvette Castleroy

Episodes

References

2013 American television seasons
2014 American television seasons